Trachodes hispidus is a species of true weevil in the beetle family Curculionidae. It is found in North America and Europe.

References

Further reading

External links

 

Molytinae
Articles created by Qbugbot
Beetles described in 1758
Taxa named by Carl Linnaeus